This is a list of members of the Australian Senate from 1941 to 1944. Half of its members were elected at the 23 October 1937 election and had terms starting on 1 July 1938 and finishing on 30 June 1944; the other half were elected at the 21 September 1940 election and had terms starting on 1 July 1941 and finishing on 30 June 1947. The process for filling casual vacancies was complex. While senators were elected for a six-year term, people appointed to a casual vacancy only held office until the earlier of the next election for the House of Representatives or the Senate.

The Government changed during the Senate term as the minority government, a Coalition of the Country Party led by Prime Minister of Australia Arthur Fadden and the United Australia Party led by Billy Hughes lost the confidence of the House of Representatives in October 1941. The Australian Labor Party, led by John Curtin, formed a minority government.

Notes

References

Members of Australian parliaments by term
20th-century Australian politicians
Australian Senate lists